Vidas marcadas is a 1942 Argentine film.

Cast
 Mecha Ortiz as Malena
 George Rigaud		
 Sebastián Chiola		
 Roberto Fugazot		
 Haydeé Larroca		
 Alberto Terrones		
 Cayetano Biondo

External links
 

1942 films
1940s Spanish-language films
Argentine black-and-white films
Argentine romantic drama films
1942 romantic drama films
Films directed by Daniel Tinayre
1940s Argentine films